Labour Friends of Palestine and the Middle East (LFPME) is a parliamentary group within the British Labour Party that promotes support for Palestine and campaigns for "peace and justice in the Middle East through the implementation of international law and respect for human rights". LFPME was formed in 2009 as a private company.

According to their website, "LFPME supports a viable two-state solution that delivers justice and freedom for the Palestinian people as called for by the overwhelming international consensus and enshrined under international law and in UN resolutions."

It is chaired by Julie Elliott. The late Jo Cox was a supporter, and so is former Labour leader Jeremy Corbyn.
Current Labour leader Keir Starmer is also a supporter.

Current parliamentary members
As of 2019, the parliamentary members of the group are:

See also
 Labour Friends of Israel
 Conservative Friends of Palestine

References

External links
 

 
Organisations associated with the Labour Party (UK)
State of Palestine–United Kingdom relations
United Kingdom friendship associations
2009 establishments in the United Kingdom